Bengt Levin (30 September 1958 – 1 January 2020) was a Swedish orienteering competitor. He won a silver medal in the relay event at the 1981 World Orienteering Championships in Thun, along with Lars-Henrik Undeland, Jörgen Mårtensson and Lars Lönnkvist. At the 1983 World Championships in Zalaegerszeg he placed 14th in the classic distance, and won a bronze medal with the Swedish relay team.

References

1958 births
2020 deaths
Swedish orienteers
Male orienteers
Foot orienteers
World Orienteering Championships medalists